"Mamãe eu quero" (English: "Mom, I want it") is a 1937 Brazilian song composed by Vicente Paiva and Jararaca, and is one of the most famous Brazilian songs. The original recording was made by one of the composers, Jararaca, in 1937 and recorded on Odeon Records.

The song, however, won international level visibility under the title "I Want My Mama", by Carmen Miranda. The "carnival march" was included in her debut on Broadway and then in the film Down Argentine Way (1940). The song was also recorded by Bing Crosby and the Andrews Sisters. It was also featured in the 1943 Tom & Jerry short "Baby Puss", as performed by a trio of cartoon cats.

The song was performed in the 2016 Summer Olympics closing ceremony at the Maracanã Stadium on 21 August 2016.

T-Rio version
In 2004, Brazilian girl group T-Rio released their version titled "Choopeta (Mamãe eu quero)", from their 2004 debut album, Choopeta. The song gained huge success in Thailand, the Philippines, Canada, Morocco, Romania, and France. It sold over 400,000 copies in France alone.

Charts

Weekly charts

Year-end charts

Usage in popular culture
Films

References

1937 songs
2004 singles
Carmen Miranda songs
The Andrews Sisters songs
Bing Crosby songs
Brazilian songs
Portuguese-language songs
Latin pop songs